A list of populated places in Afyonkarahisar Province, Turkey by district:

Afyonkarahisar (Central district)

Afyonkarahisar
Alcalı, Afyonkarahisar
Anıtkaya, Afyonkarahisar
Ata, Afyonkarahisar
Bayatcık, Afyonkarahisar
Bayramgazi, Afyonkarahisar
Belkaracaören, Afyonkarahisar
Beyyazı, Afyonkarahisar
Bostanlı, Afyonkarahisar
Halımoru, Afyonkarahisar
Burhaniye, Afyonkarahisar
Büyükkalecik, Afyonkarahisar
Çakır, Afyonkarahisar
Çavdarlı, Afyonkarahisar
Çayırbağ, Afyonkarahisar
Çıkrık, Afyonkarahisar
Değirmenayvalı, Afyonkarahisar
Değirmendere, Afyonkarahisar
Demirçevre, Afyonkarahisar
Erenler, Afyonkarahisar
Erkmen, Afyonkarahisar
Fethibey, Afyonkarahisar
Gebeceler, Afyonkarahisar
Gözsüzlü, Afyonkarahisar
Işıklar, Afyonkarahisar
İsmail, Afyonkarahisar
Kaplanlı, Afyonkarahisar
Karaarslan, Afyonkarahisar
Kışlacık, Afyonkarahisar
Kızıldağ, Afyonkarahisar
Kozluca, Afyonkarahisar
Köprülü, Afyonkarahisar
Küçükçobanlı, Afyonkarahisar
Küçükkalecik, Afyonkarahisar
Nuribey, Afyonkarahisar
Olucak, Afyonkarahisar
Omuzca, Afyonkarahisar
Saadet, Afyonkarahisar
Sadıkbey, Afyonkarahisar
Salar, Afyonkarahisar
Saraydüzü, Afyonkarahisar
Sarık, Afyonkarahisar
Susuz, Afyonkarahisar
Sülümenli, Afyonkarahisar
Sülün, Afyonkarahisar
Yarımca, Afyonkarahisar

Bayat

Bayat, Afyonkarahisar
Akpınar, Bayat
Aşağıçaybelen, Bayat
Derbent, Bayat
Eskigömü, Bayat
Kuzören, Bayat
Mallıca, Bayat
Muratkoru, Bayat
Sağırlı, Bayat
Yukarıçaybelen, Bayat
Çukurkuyu, Bayat
İmrallı, Bayat
İnpınar, Bayat

Başmakçı

Başmakçı, Afyonkarahisar
Akkeçili, Başmakçı
Akkoyunlu, Başmakçı
Akpınar, Başmakçı
Beltarla, Başmakçı
Ekinlik, Başmakçı
Hırka, Başmakçı
Küllüce, Başmakçı
Ovacık, Başmakçı
Sarıköy, Başmakçı
Yaka, Başmakçı
Yassıören, Başmakçı
Yukarıbeltarla, Başmakçı
Çevlik, Başmakçı
Çığrı, Başmakçı

Bolvadin

Bolvadin
Büyükkarabağ, Bolvadin
Derekarabağ, Bolvadin
Dipevler, Bolvadin
Dişli, Bolvadin
Güney Bolvadin
Güney, Bolvadin
Hamidiye, Bolvadin
Karayokuş, Bolvadin
Kemerkaya, Bolvadin
Kurucaova, Bolvadin
Kutlu, Bolvadin
Nusratlı, Bolvadin
Ortakarabağ, Bolvadin
Taşağıl, Bolvadin
Taşlıdere, Bolvadin
Yürükkaracaören, Bolvadin
Özburun, Bolvadin

Çay

Çay
Akkonak, Çay
Armutlu, Çay
Aydoğmuş, Çay
Bulanık, Çay
Cumhuriyet, Çay
Deresinek, Çay
Devederesi, Çay
Eber, Çay
Göcen, Çay
Kadıköy, Çay
Karacaören, Çay
Karamık, Çay
Kılıçkaya, Çay
Kılıçyaka, Çay
Koçbeyli, Çay
Maltepe, Çay
Orhaniye, Çay
Pazarağaç, Çay
Pınarkaya, Çay
Yeşilyurt, Çay
Çay, Afyonkarahisar
Çayırpınar, Çay
Çayıryazı, Çay
İnli, Çay

Çobanlar

Çobanlar
Akkoyunlu, Çobanlar
Göynük, Çobanlar
Kaleköy, Çobanlar
Kocaöz, Çobanlar
Çobanlar, Afyonkarahisar

Dazkırı

Dazkırı
Akarca, Dazkırı
Arıköy, Dazkırı
Aşağıyenice, Dazkırı
Bozan, Dazkırı
Darıcılar, Dazkırı
Hasandede, Dazkırı
Hisaralan, Dazkırı
Karaağaçkuyusu, Dazkırı
Sarıkavak, Dazkırı
Yaylaköy, Dazkırı
Yukarıyenice, Dazkırı
Yüreğil, Dazkırı
Çiftlikköy, Dazkırı
Örtülü, Dazkırı
İdrisköy, Dazkırı

Dinar

Dinar, Afyonkarahisar
Afşar, Dinar
Akgün, Dinar
Akpınarlı, Dinar
Aktoprak, Dinar
Akça, Dinar
Akçin, Dinar
Alacaatlı, Dinar
Alparslan, Dinar
Avdan, Dinar
Bademli, Dinar
Bağcılar, Dinar
Belenpınar, Dinar
Bilgiç, Dinar
Burunkaya, Dinar
Bülüçalan, Dinar
Cerityaylası, Dinar
Cumhuriyet, Dinar
Dikici, Dinar
Dombay, Dinar
Doğanlı, Dinar
Dumanköy, Dinar
Eldere, Dinar
Ergenli, Dinar
Gençali, Dinar
Gökçeli, Dinar
Göçerli, Dinar
Haydarlı, Dinar
Kabaklı, Dinar
Kadılar, Dinar
Karabedir, Dinar
Karahacılı, Dinar
Karakuyu, Dinar
Karataş, Dinar
Kazanpınar, Dinar
Keklicek, Dinar
Kınık, Dinar
Kızıllı, Dinar
Körpeli, Dinar
Muratlı, Dinar
Ocaklı, Dinar
Okçular, Dinar
Palaz, Dinar
Pınarlı, Dinar
Sütlaç, Dinar
Tatarlı, Dinar
Tekin, Dinar
Tuğaylı, Dinar
Uluköy, Dinar
Yakaköy, Dinar
Yapağılı, Dinar
Yelalan, Dinar
Yeşilhüyük, Dinar
Yeşilyurt, Dinar
Yeşilçat, Dinar
Yıprak, Dinar
Yüksel, Dinar
Çakıcı, Dinar
Çamlı, Dinar
Çapalı , Dinar
Çayüstü, Dinar
Çağlayan, Dinar
Çiçektepe, Dinar
Çobansaray, Dinar
Çürüklü, Dinar

Emirdağ

Emirdağ
Ablak, Emirdağ
Adayazı, Emirdağ
Alibeyce, Emirdağ
Avdan, Emirdağ
Ağılcık, Emirdağ
Aşağıaliçomak, Emirdağ
Aşağıkurudere, Emirdağ
Aşağıpiribeyli, Emirdağ
Bademli, Emirdağ
Balcam, Emirdağ
Bağlıca, Emirdağ
Başkonak, Emirdağ
Beyköy, Emirdağ
Beyören, Emirdağ
Burunarkaç, Emirdağ
Büyüktuğluk, Emirdağ
Camili, Emirdağ
Davulga, Emirdağ
Daydalı, Emirdağ
Dağılgan, Emirdağ
Dağınık, Emirdağ
Demircili, Emirdağ
Dereköy, Emirdağ
Ekizce, Emirdağ
Elhan, Emirdağ
Emirinköyü, Emirdağ
Eskiakören, Emirdağ
Eşrefli, Emirdağ
Gedikevi, Emirdağ
Gelincik, Emirdağ
Gökçeyaka, Emirdağ
Gömü, Emirdağ
Gözeli, Emirdağ
Güneyköy, Emirdağ
Güneysaray, Emirdağ
Güveççi, Emirdağ
Hamzahacılı, Emirdağ
Hisar, Emirdağ
Karaağaç, Emirdağ
Karacalar, Emirdağ
Karakuyu, Emirdağ
Karayatak, Emirdağ
Kılıçlar, Emirdağ
Kılıçlı Kavlaklı, Emirdağ
Kılıçlı kavlaklı, Emirdağ
Kırkpınar, Emirdağ
Kuruca, Emirdağ
Leylekli, Emirdağ
Salihler, Emirdağ
Sığracık, Emirdağ
Soğukkuyu, Emirdağ
Suvermez, Emirdağ
Tabaklar, Emirdağ
Tepeköy, Emirdağ
Tezköy, Emirdağ
Toklucak, Emirdağ
Topdere, Emirdağ
Türkmen, Emirdağ
Türkmenakören, Emirdağ
Umraniye, Emirdağ
Veysel, Emirdağ
Y. kurudere, Emirdağ
Yarıkkaya, Emirdağ
Yarımca, Emirdağ
Yavuz, Emirdağ
Yenikapı, Emirdağ
Yenikoy
Yeniköy, Emirdağ
Yukarıkurudere, Emirdağ
Yusufağa, Emirdağ
Yüreğil, Emirdağ
Çatallı, Emirdağ
Çaykışla, Emirdağ
Çiftlik, Emirdağ
Çiftlikköy, Emirdağ
Örenköy, Emirdağ
Özkan, Emirdağ
İncik, Emirdağ

Evciler

Evciler, Afyonkarahisar
Akyarma, Evciler
Altınova, Evciler
Baraklı, Evciler
Bostancı, Evciler
Gökçek, Evciler
Körkuyu, Evciler
Madenler, Evciler

Hocalar

Hocalar
Akçadere, Hocalar
Avgancık, Hocalar
Davulga, Hocalar
Devlethan, Hocalar
Güre, Hocalar
Kocagöl, Hocalar
Kozluca, Hocalar
Uluköy, Hocalar
Yağcı, Hocalar
Yeşilhisar, Hocalar
Çalca, Hocalar
Çepni, Hocalar
Örencik, Hocalar
Örtülü, Hocalar
İhsaniye, Hocalar

İhsaniye

İhsaniye
Ablak, İhsaniye
Ayazini, İhsaniye
Aşağıtandır, İhsaniye
Basırlar, İhsaniye
Bayramaliler, İhsaniye
Beyköy, İhsaniye
Bozhüyük, İhsaniye
Cumalı, İhsaniye
Demirli, İhsaniye
Döğer, İhsaniye
Eskieymir, İhsaniye
Eynehankuzviran, İhsaniye
Gazlıgöl, İhsaniye
Gazlıgölakören, İhsaniye
Hacıbeyli, İhsaniye
Kadımürsel, İhsaniye
Karacaahmet, İhsaniye
Kayıhan, İhsaniye
Kıyır, İhsaniye
Muratlar, İhsaniye
Orhanlı, İhsaniye
Osmanköy, İhsaniye
Oğulbeyli, İhsaniye
Sarıcaova, İhsaniye
Susuzosmaniye, İhsaniye
Yenice, İhsaniye
Yiğitpınarı, İhsaniye
Yukarıtandır, İhsaniye
Üçlerkayası, İhsaniye
İğdemir, İhsaniye

İscehisar

İscehisar
Alanyurt, İscehisar
Bahçecik, İscehisar
Cevizli, İscehisar
Doğanlar, İscehisar
Doğlat, İscehisar
Karaağaç, İscehisar
Karakaya, İscehisar
Konarı, İscehisar
Olukpınar, İscehisar
Selimiye, İscehisar
Seydiler, İscehisar
Çalışlar, İscehisar
Çatağıl, İscehisar

Kızılören

Kızılören
Ekinova, Kızılören
Gülyazı, Kızılören
Türkbelkavak, Kızılören
Yenibelkavak, Kızılören

Sandıklı

Sandıklı
Akharım, Sandıklı
Akın, Sandıklı
Alacami, Sandıklı
Alagöz, Sandıklı
Alamescit, Sandıklı
Arızlar, Sandıklı
Asmacık, Sandıklı
Ballık, Sandıklı
Başağaç, Sandıklı
Başkuyucak, Sandıklı
Baştepe, Sandıklı
Bektaşköy, Sandıklı
Celiloğlu, Sandıklı
Daylık, Sandıklı
Dodurga, Sandıklı
Dutağacı, Sandıklı
Ekinhisar, Sandıklı
Emirhisar, Sandıklı
Gökçealan, Sandıklı
Gürsu, Sandıklı
Hırka, Sandıklı
Karacaören, Sandıklı
Karadirek, Sandıklı
Karasandıklı, Sandıklı
Kargın, Sandıklı
Kınık, Sandıklı
Kızık, Sandıklı
Kızılca, Sandıklı
Koçgazi, Sandıklı
Koçhisar, Sandıklı
Kusura, Sandıklı
Kuyucak, Sandıklı
Menteş, Sandıklı
Nasuhoğlu, Sandıklı
Odaköy, Sandıklı
Otluk, Sandıklı
Reşadiye, Sandıklı
Saltık, Sandıklı
Selçik, Sandıklı
Sorkun, Sandıklı
Soğucak, Sandıklı
Susuz, Sandıklı
Yanıkören, Sandıklı
Yavaşlar, Sandıklı
Yayman, Sandıklı
Yolkonak, Sandıklı
Yumurca, Sandıklı
Çambeyli, Sandıklı
Çevrepınar, Sandıklı
Çiğiltepe, Sandıklı
Çomoğlu, Sandıklı
Çukurca, Sandıklı
Örenkaya, Sandıklı
Örmekuyu, Sandıklı
Ülfeciler, Sandıklı
Ürküt, Sandıklı
Şeyhyahşi, Sandıklı

Sinanpaşa

Sinanpaşa
Ahmetpaşa, Sinanpaşa
Akdeğirmen, Sinanpaşa
Akçaşar, Sinanpaşa
Akören, Sinanpaşa
Ayvalı, Sinanpaşa
Balmahmut, Sinanpaşa
Başkimse, Sinanpaşa
Boyalı, Sinanpaşa
Bulca, Sinanpaşa
Düzağaç, Sinanpaşa
Elvanpaşa, Sinanpaşa
Garipçe, Sinanpaşa
Gezler, Sinanpaşa
Güney, Sinanpaşa
Karacaören, Sinanpaşa
Kayadibi, Sinanpaşa
Kılıçarslan, Sinanpaşa
Kınık, Sinanpaşa
Kırka, Sinanpaşa
Küçükhüyük, Sinanpaşa
Nuh, Sinanpaşa
Saraycık, Sinanpaşa
Savran, Sinanpaşa
Tazlar, Sinanpaşa
Taşoluk, Sinanpaşa
Tınaztepe, Sinanpaşa
Tokuşlar, Sinanpaşa
Yıldırımkemal, Sinanpaşa
Yörükmezarı, Sinanpaşa
Çalışlar, Sinanpaşa
Çatkuyu, Sinanpaşa
Çayhisar, Sinanpaşa
Çobanözü, Sinanpaşa
İğdeli, Sinanpaşa

Şuhut

Şuhut
Akyuva, Şuhut
Anayurt, Şuhut
Arızlı, Şuhut
Atlıhisar, Şuhut
Aydın, Şuhut
Ağzıkara, Şuhut
Bademli, Şuhut
Balçıkhisar, Şuhut
Başören, Şuhut
Bozan, Şuhut
Dadak, Şuhut
Demirbel, Şuhut
Efe, Şuhut
Güneytepe, Şuhut
Hallaç, Şuhut
Karaadilli, Şuhut
Karacaören, Şuhut
Karahallı, Şuhut
Karlık, Şuhut
Kavaklı, Şuhut
Kayabelen, Şuhut
Kılınçkaya, Şuhut
Koçyatağı, Şuhut
Kulak, Şuhut
Mahmutköy, Şuhut
Ortapınar, Şuhut
Oynağan, Şuhut
Paşacık, Şuhut
Senirköyü, Şuhut
TekkeKöyü, Şuhut
Uzunpınar, Şuhut
Yarışlı, Şuhut
Çakırözü, Şuhut
Çobankaya, Şuhut
İcikli, Şuhut
İlyaslı, Şuhut
İsalı, Şuhut

Sultandağı

Sultandağı
Akbaba, Sultandağı
Dereçine, Sultandağı
Doğancık, Sultandağı
Karakışla, Sultandağı
Karapınar, Sultandağı
Kırca, Sultandağı
Taşköprü, Sultandağı
Yakasinek, Sultandağı
Yenikarabağ, Sultandağı
Yeşilçiftlik, Sultandağı
Çamözü, Sultandağı
Çukurcak, Sultandağı
Üçkuyu, Sultandağı

External links
Turkstat

Afyonkarahisar
List